Ron McBride is an American football coach.

Ron McBride or McBryde may also refer to:
Ron McBride (running back) (born 1948), former running back for the Green Bay Packers of the NFL
Ron McBryde (1941–1989), politician in Manitoba, Canada